John Peter McArthur (July 16, 1862 – February 19, 1942) was a politician from Alberta, Canada.

McArthur first ran for the Legislative Assembly of Alberta in a by-election on October 31, 1911 after the death of his brother Archibald J. McArthur a few months earlier. He would have Harold Riley who was the brother of Ezra Riley the previous representative for the seat, in the brothers by-election. McArthur would be handily defeated as Riley and the Conservatives would surprisingly sweep this and 3 other by-elections in a wave of support held on the same day.

During the 1913 Alberta general election Incumbent Riley moved to the neighboring electoral district of Bow Valley leaving the riding vacant. McArthur won his second attempt at office and held the district for 1 turn before being defeated by Fred Davis in the 1917 Alberta general election.

References

Legislative Assembly of Alberta Members Listing

Alberta Liberal Party MLAs
1862 births
1942 deaths